Chung Yun-seong (born 27 March 1998) is a South Korean tennis player.

Chung has a career high ATP singles ranking of 262 achieved on 17 December 2018. He also has a career high ATP doubles ranking of 412 achieved on 27 February 2017. Chung has won five ITF doubles titles.

On the junior tour, Chung had a career-high combined ranking of 3 achieved on 21 March 2016. Chung was a semifinalist at the 2016 Australian Open boys' singles event and the 2015 US Open boys' singles event where he fell to both eventual champions Oliver Anderson and Taylor Fritz, respectively. Chung was also a singles finalist at the Osaka Mayor's Cup in 2014.

He and Orlando Luz lost to Yishai Oliel of Israel and Patrik Rikl of the Czech Republic in the final of the 2016 French Open boys' doubles, 6–3, 6–4.

Junior Grand Slam finals

Doubles: 1 (1 runner-up)

ATP Challenger and ITF Futures/World Tennis Tour finals

Singles: 8 (4–4)

Doubles: 21 (12 titles, 9 runners-up)

References

External links
 
 

1998 births
Living people
South Korean male tennis players
Tennis players from Seoul
People from Namyangju
Tennis players at the 2014 Summer Youth Olympics
20th-century South Korean people
21st-century South Korean people